Birmenstorf is the name of a municipality in Switzerland and in the canton Aargau:
 Birmenstorf, Aargau
It should not be confused with the Birmensdorf in canton Zurich:
 Birmensdorf, Zurich